TSMMR is an acronym that may stand for:

Tsu Shi Ma Mi Re, an all-female band from Japan
Tri-State Mini-Moto Racing; see Pocketbike racing